Capnolymma is a genus of beetles in the family Cerambycidae, containing the following species:

 Capnolymma borneana Ohbayashi, 1994
 Capnolymma brunnea Gressitt & Rondon, 1970
 Capnolymma capreola Pascoe, 1866
 Capnolymma cingalensis Gahan, 1906
 Capnolymma ishiharai Ohbayashi, 1994
 Capnolymma laotica Gressitt & Rondon, 1970
 Capnolymma ohbayashii Holzschuh, 2006
 Capnolymma similis Gressitt & Rondon, 1970
 Capnolymma stygia Pascoe, 1858

References

Lepturinae